Habeeb Muhammed (28 February 1965 – 30 November 2017), better known by his stage name Kalabhavan Abi, was an Indian impressionist, comedian, actor, and dubbing artist.

Personal life
Abi was born as the third son to Kavumkara Thadathikkudiyil (Thonganal) Bava Khan, a noted social worker and the former state general secretary of Kerala Congress, and Payipra Ezhuthanikattu Ummakunju on 28 February 1965 at Muvattupuzha, Ernakulam. He has two elder brothers Ameer Navas and Kabeer B Haroon, and a younger sister Raziya. He had his primary education at Government Higher Secondary School, Muvattupuzha. He did his pre university degree from Maharaja's College, Ernakulam. He studied Sanitary Inspector's Diploma Course (S.I.) at Mumbai.

He was married to Sunila. They had a son, Shane Nigam, two daughters, Ahana and Aleena. They settled at Elamakkara, Kochi. He was under treatment for aplastic anemia for two years before his death. On 30 November 2017 he was taken to Amrita Hospital at around 8 a.m. after he complained of uneasiness. Doctors confirmed death after half an hour. The death happened 45 mins before that.
His funeral took place at Perumattam, Muvattupuzha Muslim Jamath mosque.

Career
Abi began his stage career in Youth Festivals in the Mahatma Gandhi University and had twice bagged the first prize in mimicry competitions which brought him into the mimicry troupe Kalabhavan. Later, he worked in the troupes Cochin Sagar, Cochin Oscar and Harisree. Cochin Sagar is a troupe he formed in 1990 and later on has worked in its banner. His debut film was Nayam Vyakthamakkunnu in 1991, and has then acted in about 50 films. As a stage performer, he is best known for his performance as an elderly Muslim woman named Amina Thatha, and is also known for mimicking voice of actor Mammootty. Along with Dileep and Nadirshah, Abi is one among the pioneers that produced comedy audio albums, Dhe Maveli Kombathu and Onathinidakku Puttu kachavadam in the 1990s. Abhi was also the voice behind Amitabh Bachchan in many Malayalam dubbed advertisements. His popular movies are Kireedamillatha Rajakkanmar, Aniyathipravu, Mazhavil Koodaram and Rasikan. Abi's last film was Thrissivaperoor Kliptham in 2017. Abi's son, Shane Nigam, is an actor.

Filmography

Actor
All films are in Malayalam language unless otherwise noted.

Singer

Television
Prekshakare Avashyamundu (Mazhavil Manorama)
Midukki (Mazhavil Manorama)
Cinemaa Chirimaa(Mazhavil Manorama)

References

1965 births
2017 deaths
Male actors from Kerala
Male actors in Malayalam cinema
Male actors in Malayalam television
Indian impressionists (entertainers)
People from Ernakulam district